The chestnut-breasted chlorophonia (Chlorophonia pyrrhophrys) is a bird species in the family Fringillidae (formerly in Thraupidae).
It is found in Colombia, Ecuador, Peru, and Venezuela.
Its natural habitat is subtropical or tropical moist montane forests.

References

chestnut-breasted chlorophonia
Birds of Mexico
Birds of Guatemala
Birds of Honduras
chestnut-breasted chlorophonia
chestnut-breasted chlorophonia
Taxonomy articles created by Polbot